Pia Nilsson may refer to:

 Pia Nilsson (golfer) (born 1958), Swedish professional golfer and coach
 Pia Nilsson (politician) (born 1962), Swedish social democratic politician